Ismail Omar (born 21 March 1992) is a Saudi Arabian professional footballer who plays as a winger for Saudi Professional League side Al-Faisaly.

Career
Ismail started his career at the youth team of Jeddah and made his first team debut in 2014. On 8 September 2020, he joined Al-Faisaly on a three-year contract. On 27 May 2021, Omar started the 2021 King Cup Final against Al-Taawoun and helped Al-Faisaly win their first title.

Honours
Al-Faisaly
 King Cup: 2020–21

References

External links
 

1992 births
Living people
Sportspeople from Jeddah
Saudi Arabian footballers
Association football wingers
Jeddah Club players
Al-Faisaly FC players
Saudi Professional League players
Saudi First Division League players
Saudi Second Division players
Saudi Fourth Division players